Roxy Paine (born 1966, New York City) is an American painter and sculptor widely known for his installations that often convey elements of conflict between the natural world and the artificial plains man creates. He was educated at both the College of Santa Fe (now Santa Fe University of Art and Design) in New Mexico and the Pratt Institute in New York.

Since 1990, Paine's works have been exhibited in major collections and galleries across the United States, Germany, Sweden, England, the Netherlands, and Israel. His most reviewed exhibitions include Replicants, Machines, Dendroids, and Dioramas. Paine is represented by Paul Kasmin Gallery in New York The Kavi Gupta Gallery of Chicago & Berlin, and by the Marianne Boesky Gallery in New York. Roxy Paine currently lives and works in Brooklyn and Treadwell, New York.

Biography 
Paine was born in New York City and raised in the suburbs of northern Virginia. Throughout his childhood, he spent his free time exploring the wooded, overgrown areas of land that separated housing developments in his neighborhood. He describes his experience of growing up in suburbia as a "twisted vision of nature", his environment possessing an "overwhelming blandness". Around age 13 or 14, Paine used his local creek as a place to explore. "There was a creek nearby when I was growing up. That's where I spent most of my time. I would constantly reroute the stream, building dams. I was mostly interested in the water. What I remember distinctly about nature in the suburbs were the borders. The natural world is totally controlled and manipulated in suburbia."At age 15, Paine ran away to California to live with his brother, a hiker and rock climber. His brother's "outdoor western" influence spurred them to hike places like Yosemite and Joshua Tree. Living in California helped Paine make his decision to become an artist. He moved to New Mexico and enrolled at the College of Santa Fe, but he soon dropped out due to poor relations with his professors. "In general, the teachers hated me. I always had problems with art teachers. I don't know why. I didn't go in trying to be confrontational, but it always ended up with bad blood somehow."He then moved to New York and attended Pratt Institute for a time, originally as a painting major but later switching to sculpture. In addition to paintings, Paine produced unusual, functional ceramic and metal musical instruments. He eventually dropped out of Pratt, and with help from some of his colleagues, formed the artist collective Brand Name Damages in 1989.

Work
In his body of work, Paine mirrors natural processes, drawing increasingly on the tension between organic and man-made environments, between the human desire for order and nature's drive to reproduce. His highly detailed simulations of natural phenomena include an ambitious series of hand-wrought stainless steel trees, vitrines of mushroom and plant life in various states of decay and several large-scale machines designed to replicate creative processes. Many of his works create a platform to ask aesthetic questions about art, the natural, and the unnatural world rather than answer these questions like his counterparts he ignites the flame of inquiry. Collectively, his works demonstrate the human attempt to impose order on natural forces, depicting the struggle between the natural and the artificial, the rational and the instinctual. Paine has said, "I'm interested in taking entities that are organic and outside of the industrial realm, feeding them into an industrial system, and seeing what results from that force-feeding. The end results are a seamless containment of these opposites."

Early work
Paine began showing his work in Williamsburg, Brooklyn in 1990 and 1991 at an artist run collective called Brand Name Damages (which he helped to found) and he had his first solo exhibition at the short-lived Herron Test-Site in October 1992. His early work consisted of kinetic and time-based sculptures such as Viscous Pult, 1990, which consisted of a paint brush smearing ketchup, white paint and motor oil on the gallery space's front window; and Displaced Sink, 1992, which had a leaking pipe in the ceiling dripping water on a tall stack of soap bars, leaving a pool of semi-liquid soap to collect on the gallery floor.

His next solo exhibition was at Ronald Feldman Gallery in 1995, and it included other kinetic works, but the central and most critically acclaimed work was a piece called Dinner of the Dictators, 1993–95, a vitrine enclosing the taxidermied favorite meals of infamous dictators, ranging from Genghis Khan and Adolf Hitler to Napoleon Bonaparte and Suharto. The research alone took eight months, and overall, the work took two years to produce, opening Paine to new approaches and processes in his work.

From this point onward, Paine's work separated into a few distinct but nevertheless related categories. The first involves naturalistic works: minutely precise reproductions of natural objects like mushrooms, leafy plants or poppies. A second category consists of machine-based works: he has devised a number of conceptually-challenging art-making machines, like the SCUMAK (Auto Sculpture Maker), 1998, PMU (Painting Manufacturing Unit), 1999–2000, and the Erosion Machine, 2005. Bridging the gap between the naturalistic and mechanized works, Paine also creates large-scale stainless steel trees and boulders of varying sizes (ranging from 8 – 50 feet in height).

Replicants

Paine's vitrines and botanical works often feature replicas of plants that have been discovered as extremely poisonous or have been used by humans for experimental hallucinogenic or drug experiences. The living plants are cast and subsequently rendered in thermoset polymers, paint, lacquer, and epoxy, among other materials. Crop, 1997–98, shows a field of poppies, with ripened pods exposing the evidence of raw opium being readied for harvest. The piece embodies the shifting views of the beauty of a field of wild flowers and the grave potential of drug addiction. Amanita Muscaria Field, 2000, shows a field of psychoactive mushrooms that appear as if they are sprouting from the gallery floor. This field might present multiple readings: are these works a hallucinogenic vision on their own or do they represent the plant life that offers the possibility of arriving at that vision? Another related series of works is that of the Dead Amanita vitrines, lifelike mushrooms seem to be decaying under glass. The genus Amanita is a group of poisonous and psychoactive mushrooms that has some species that are among the deadliest if ingested by humans.

Another example is the leafy plant genus Datura, which has long been used as a poison and hallucinogen; many species are known by common names such as Hell's Bells or Devil's weed. Paine's re-creation of various species of Datura take on a state of potential, presenting us with a deceptively simple plant that nonetheless contains complex molecules that can give rise to an altered state of consciousness.

Machines

Removing the artist's hand in the creative process and replacing it with a computer program is the crux of Paine's machine-based works. His first art-making machine, Paint Dipper, 1997, employed a steel armature that continuously dipped canvases into a vat of paint over the course of time, creating works that collect latex paint stalactites along the bottom edge. SCUMAK (Auto Sculpture Maker), 1998–2001, melts plastic with pigments and periodically extrudes them onto a conveyor belt, creating bulbous shaped sculptures that are each unique.

PMU (Painting Manufacturing Unit), from 1999–2000, involves a metal painting arm that is programmed to expel white paint onto a canvas according to specific instructions programmed into the machine. The resulting works often can evoke landscapes or possibly layers of geological sediment.

Most recently, Paine introduced his Erosion Machine, 2005, which consists of a robotic arm that traces and cuts patterns into large blocks of stone. The course of the arm's movement is determined by data sets, such as weather conditions and school test results. The work suggests the corrosive effects of human imposition on the environment while at the same time represents the transformation of the banal into the beautiful.

About the SCUMAK (Auto Sculpture Maker), art historian Jonathan Fineburg wrote that "The beauty of the machine and the eccentricity of the results are also a paean to the romantic. Paine positions both his gardens and his machines at a fluid interface of man, nature, and science; they take the viewer to an intuitive experience of the liminal place at which scientists have arrived as they begin to redesign the human genome and connect living neurons with silicon chips."

Dendroids
Paine uses both mechanical means and the innate logic of natural forms to create his "Dendroid" tree-like sculptures. Paine's meticulous research and observation of a variety of tree species help him to understand the "language" of how a tree grows, and from there he creates fictional tree species that grow to a logic of their own. Paine has said: I've processed the idea of a tree and created a system for its form. I take this organic majestic being and break it down into components and rules. The branches are translated into pipe and rod. Employing the language that he has invented pertaining to each of these fictive species, Paine's trees are "grown" through a laborious process of welding together the cylindrical piping and rods of diminishing size. He has also described his aims with the Dendroids series by saying, "I have been seeking to expand the edges of the language, and send the work outward into those edges. Essentially, I am establishing the rules of a language, only to then break those rules."

The first of these dendroids was Impostor, 1999, now at the Wanas Foundation, in Knislinge, Sweden. He has gone on to create 25 of these sculptures, including Bluff, 2002, which premiered in New York's Central Park during the Whitney Biennial in 2002, and the very ambitious Conjoined, 2007, recently on display in Manhattan's Madison Square Park (through December 31, 2007). Conjoined is a 40 ft tall by 45 ft wide sculpture of two trees whose branches cantilever in space and connect in mid air. Paine creates two different fictional tree species where each branch from one tree joins with a branch from the other. For the observer, it is unclear where one tree begins and the other ends. "Conjoined" was acquired in 2008 by and is on display at the Modern Art Museum of Fort Worth.

Paine's recent sculpture, Inversion, 2008, was installed in the Public Art Projects section of Art Basel 39, in Basel, Switzerland in June 2008. It was also part of FREEDOM: Den Haag Sculptuur 2008 in The Hague, Netherlands through August 2008.

Maelstrom, 2009, was on view at the Metropolitan Museum of Art from April 28 - November 29, 2009 and Graft, 2009 was installed at the National Gallery of Art Sculpture Garden in Washington, DC, in the fall of 2009. When asked about Maelstrom Paine described it as existing on five "levels" at once:   "On one level, it's a forest that has been downed by an unseen force—a force of nature or, perhaps, a force of man. I also want the sculpture to be the force itself, a swirling, churning force. The word 'maelstrom' actually has a Dutch root; it literally means 'grinding stream,' ... The third state is trees in the state of becoming abstractions. There are areas with recognizable tree parts and then others where representation is stretching, breaking apart, and coalescing again ... I want the fourth state of trance to be a pipeline in a factory that's run amuck. This is getting back to the root of the material, so to speak, which is purely industrial. Here the piece is embracing its source. And, finally, the fifth state is that of a mental storm, or what I envision happens during an epileptic seizure." Distillation, 2010, was on view at James Cohan Gallery in New York from October 16 - December 11, 2010, and One Hundred Foot Line, 2010, was installed permanently at the National Gallery of Canada, in Ottawa, Ontario.

Distillation, as described by Hilarie Sheets in The New York Times, pushes the metaphoric content that underpins these sculptures to new extremes. It still uses arboreal forms, but they now mesh with other overtly defined branching systems: a vascular network of arteries and veins with two plump kidneys, mushroom colonies and their germinating mycelia, neuron bundles and taxonomic diagrams, and raw pipelines connected to steel tanks and industrial valves.

Ferment was permanently installed in April 2011 on the south lawn of The Nelson-Atkins Museum of Art in Kansas City, Missouri. Taking more than three years to produce, this 56-foot-tall stainless steel dendroid sculpture, as described by Paine, "was trying to capture a churning, swirling force."

In June 2014, Symbiosis (2011) was installed in Philadelphia, Pennsylvania, in Iroquois Park, originally on temporary loan to the Association for Public Art courtesy of Paine and Marianne Boesky Gallery. In 2015, the Association for Public Art received a grant from the Daniel W. Dietrich II Trust, Inc. to acquire Symbiosis, enabling the dendroid to remain in Philadelphia.

Dioramas

In September 2013 Paine debuted the first two installations of a new series of work utilizing large-scale dioramas. The two installations were revealed in an exhibition at the Kavi Gupta gallery in Chicago. The new pieces, meticulously carved from wood, are life-size replicas of a fast-food restaurant and a control room, respectively.

The new work draws from a complex dialog of Western and Eastern philosophies which both embrace and deconstruct the values and conceptual core of Paine's earlier work. Christian Viveros-Faune, in an interview with Paine, discussed Paine's interests in the Japanese philosophical aesthetic of Wabi-Sabi, which emphasizes the beauty within natural and unpredictable flaws. Paine also told Viveros-Faune of an interest in Poststructuralism and the theories of Michel Foucault on Episteme, as described by Paine-

Paine further discussed his interest in the new work as a manifestation of "A copy of a copy of a copy," which could be connected Foucault's fellow poststructuralist, Jean Baudrillard.

Gallery

Selected exhibitions
Solo Exhibitions

2016

Roxy Paine: Thermoplastic Flux, Paul Kasmin Gallery, New York, NY, September 15 - October 22

Roxy Paine: Serotonin Reuptake Inhibitor, Beeler Gallery, Columbus College of Art & Design, October 13

Roxy Paine, Gund Gallery, Columbus, Ohio, January - June 2016

2015
Articulated Confusion: The Drawings of Roxy Paine, Frederik Meijer Gardens and Sculpture Park, Grand Rapids, MI

2014
Marianne Boesky, New York, NY

2013
Roxy Paine, Kavi Gupta, Chicago, September 20 - December 20, 2013

2011
Roxy Paine: Scumaks and Dendroids, Nelson-Atkins Museum of Art, Kansas City, MO, April 29 - August 28, 2011

2010
Roxy Paine: Distillation, James Cohan Gallery, New York, October 16 - December 11, 2010

Roxy Paine, Wanas Foundation, Knislinge, Sweden

Roxy Paine: Scumaks, The Mill, Trinity College, Hartford, Connecticut

2009
Roxy Paine: Dendroid Drawings and Maquettes, James Cohan Gallery, New York, May 1 - June 6, 2009

Roxy Paine on the Roof: Maelstrom, The Metropolitan Museum of Art Roof Garden, New York, NY, April 28 - November 29, 2009
Roxy Paine: SCUMAKS", James Cohan Gallery, New York, Opened June 26, 2008

2007
Roxy Paine, Madison Square Park, New York, NY, May 15 – December 31, 2007

2006
Roxy Paine: PMU, curated by Bruce Guenther, Portland Art Museum, Portland, OR, February 25 – May 28, 2006

2004
Roxy Paine: New Work, James Cohan Gallery, New York, January 14 – February 25, 2004

Defunct, Aspen Art Museum, Aspen, CO, 2004

2002
'Roxy Paine, James Cohan Gallery, New York, November 8 - December 22, 2002Scumak, Bernard Toale Gallery, BostonRoxy Paine: Second Nature, co-curated by Joseph Ketner and Lynn Herbert, Rose
Art Museum, Brandeis University, Waltham, MA. Traveled to Contemporary Arts Museum Houston, TX; SITE Santa Fe, New Mexico; De Pont Museum of Contemporary Art, Tilburg, Netherlands (April 2002 through January 2004)

2001Roxy Paine, Museum of Contemporary Art, North Miami, FL, November 11, 2001 - January 27, 2002Roxy Paine, Grand Arts, Kansas City, MO, June 29 - August 11, 2001

"Roxy Paine", Christopher Grimes Gallery, Los Angeles, May 26 - June 30, 2001

"Roxy Paine", James Cohan Gallery, New York, April 5 - May 5, 2001Roxy Paine, Galerie Thomas Schulte, Berlin, Germany, February 13 - April 20, 2001

1999
"Roxy Paine", Roger Björkholmen Gallery, Stockholm, Sweden, February 26 - March 31, 1999Roxy Paine, Ronald Feldman Fine Arts, New York, NY, January 9 - February 13, 1999

1998Roxy Paine, Musee D'Art Americain Giverny, Giverny, France, June 1 - November 15, 1998. Traveled to Lunds Kunsthall, Lund, Sweden, March 6 - April 18, 1999Roxy Paine, Renate Schroder Galerie, Koln, Germany, April 24 - June 6, 1998

1997
"Roxy Paine", Ronald Feldman Fine Arts, New York, March 15 - April 26, 1997
"Roxy Paine", Temple Gallery, Tyler School of Art, Temple University, Philadelphia, September 5 - October 11, 1997

1995Roxy Paine, Ronald Feldman Fine Arts, New York, NY, April 29 - June 3, 1995

1992Roxy Paine, Herron Test-Site, Brooklyn, NY, October 9 - November 8, 1992

1991Horns, The Knitting Factory, New York, December 3–31, 1991

Group Exhibitions

2016Impossible Blossom, September 5, 2016, The New School, New York, NYFalse Narratives, June 24 - July 31, 2016, Pierogi, New York, NYBuilt,World, June 7—
September 4, 2016, SCAD Museum of Art, Savannah, GAAudacious: Contemporary Artists Speak Out, March 2016 - February 2017, Denver Art Museum, Denver CO

2015 Social Ecologies, Rail Curatorial Projects, December 5, 2015 - February 21, 2016, Industry City, Brooklyn NY.Devotion, Catinca Tabacaru Gallery, Co-curated by Will Corwin, November 21, 2015 - January 17, 2016, NY, NY. 20 Years / 20 Shows, SITE Santa Fe, March 12 - May 31, Santa Fe, NM. Sweet Sensation: UConn Reads 'The Omnivore's Dilemma, William Benton Museum of Art, February - March, curated by Jean Nihoul 

2013
"Out of Hand: Materializing the Postdigital", Museum of Art and Design, New York, NY

2012Lifelike, Walker Art Center, Minneapolis, MN

2011Color in Flux, Weserburg Museum für moderne Kunst, Bremen, GermanyNod Nod Wink Wink: Conceptual Art in New Mexico and Its Influences, The Harwood Museum of Art, Taos, New Mexico

2010The Secret Life of Trees, Monica de Cardenas Galleria, Zuoz, SwitzerlandOut of the Woods, Leslie Tonkonow, New York17th Biennale of Sydney: The Beauty of Distance: Songs of Survival in a Precarious Age, Sydney, Australia

2009Reflection, Refraction, Reconfiguration: Mediated Images from the Collection of Polly and Mark Addison, University Art Museum, Colorado State University, Fort Collins, CORemote Proximity: Nature in Contemporary Art, Kunstmuseum Bonn, Bonn, GermanyThe Rose at Brandeis: Works From the Collection, The Rose Art Museum, Brandeis University, Waltham, MA

2008Bending Nature, Franklin Park Conservatory, Columbus, OHBizarre Perfection, Israel Museum, Jerusalem, IsraelFreedom: Den Haag Sculpture 2008, The Hague, The NetherlandsPublic Art Projects, Art Basel 39, Basel, SwitzerlandParagons: New Abstraction from the Albright-Knox Gallery, Doris McCarthy Gallery, University of Toronto Scarborough, Toronto, Ontario

2007Delicatessen, Dorothy F. Schmidt Center Gallery, Florida Atlantic University, Boca Raton, FloridaArt Machines/Machine Art, Schirn Kunsthalle, Frankfurt, Germany. Travelled to Museum Tinguely, Basel, Switzerland (through July 2008)Molecules that Matter, Tang Teaching Museum, Saratoga Springs, NY. Travelled to Chemical Heritage Foundation, Philadelphia, Pennsylvania; College of Wooster Art Museum, Wooster, Ohio (through May 2009)The Outdoor Gallery: 40 Years of Public Art in New York City Parks, The Arsenal Gallery in Central Park, New YorkDrawings from the Collection of Martina Yamin, Davis Museum and Cultural Center, Wellesley College, MA

2006Recent Acquisitions, Musée d'art contemporain de Montréal, Montreal, Canada, October 28, 2006 - March 25, 2007Meditations in an Emergency, Museum of Contemporary Art Detroit, MI, October 28, 2006 - April 29, 2007A Brighter Day, James Cohan Gallery, New York, NYGarden Paradise, curated by Lacy Davisson Doyle and Clare Weiss, The Arsenal Gallery in Central Park, New York, NYAmerican Academy Invitational Exhibition of Painting and Sculpture, The American Academy of Arts and Letters, New York, March 7 - April 9Uneasy Nature, curated by Xandra Eden, Weatherspoon Art Museum, The University of North Carolina, Greensboro, NC, February 18 - May 28

2005Ecstasy: In and About Altered States, organized by Paul Schimmel with Gloria
Sutton, Museum of Contemporary Art, Los Angeles, CAThe Empire of Sighs, Numark Gallery, Washington D.C.Extreme Abstraction, Albright Knox Art Gallery, Buffalo, NYSculpture, James Cohan Gallery, New YorkFlower Myth. Vincent van Gogh to Jeff Koons, Fondation Beyeler, Riehen/Basel, SwitzerlandMaterial Terrain: A Sculptural Exploration of Landscape and Place, curated by Carla Hanzal, commissioned by Laumeier Sculpture Park, St. Louis, MO. Traveling to Santa Cruz Museum of Art and History, Santa Cruz, CA; University of Arizona Museum of Art, Tucson, AZ; Memphis Brooks Museum of Art, Memphis, TN; Cheekwood Museum of Art, Nashville, TN; Lowe Art Museum, University of Miami, Coral Gables, FL (February 2005 through December 2007)

2004PILLish: Harsh Realities and Gorgeous Disasters, curated by Cydney Payton, Museum of Contemporary Art Denver, Denver, CO, through January 2, 2005Paintings That Paint Themselves, or so it seems, Kresge Art Museum, Michigan State University, East Lansing, MISummer Show, James Cohan Gallery, New YorkBetween the Lines, James Cohan Gallery, New YorkThe Flower as Image, Louisiana Museum for Moderne Kunst, Humlebaek, DenmarkNatural Histories: Realism Revisited, Scottsdale Museum of Contemporary Art, Scottsdale, AZ, May 29 - September 12

2003Work Ethic, Baltimore Museum of Art, Baltimore, Maryland, October 12, 2003 - January 11, 2004. Traveled to the Des Moines Center for the Arts May 15 - August 1, 2004UnNaturally, organized by Independent Curators International (ICI), curated by Mary-Kay Lombino. Traveled to Contemporary Art Museum, University of South Florida, Tampa, FL; H & R Block Artspace at the Kansas City Art Institute, Kansas City, MO; Fisher Gallery, University of Southern California, Los Angeles, CA; Copia: The American Center for Wine, Food and the Arts, Napa, CA; Lowe Art Museum, University of Miami, Coral Gables, FL (January 2003 through November 2004)The Great Drawing Show 1550-2003 A.D, Michael Kohn Gallery, Los Angeles, April 12 - May 31Decade, Schroeder Romero, Brooklyn, April 11 - May 19

2002The Whitney Biennial in Central Park, curated by Tom Eccles, organized by the
Public Art Fund, New York in collaboration with The Whitney Museum of American Art, New YorkEarly Acclaim: Emerging Artist Award Recipients 1997-2001, The Aldrich Museum of Contemporary Art, Ridgefield, CT, September 22 - December 31

2001Painting Matter, James Cohan Gallery, New York, May 3 - June 15, 20022001 Brooklyn!, Palm Beach Institute of Contemporary Art, Palm Beach, FL, September 4 - November 25Arte y Naturaleza, Outdoor Sculpture Garden, Montenmedio Arte Contemporaneo, Cadiz, Spain, June 2 - October 2Present Tense 6, Israel Museum, Jerusalem, Israel, May - DecemberA Contemporary Cabinet of Curiosities - Selections from the Vicki and Kent Logan Collection, California College of Arts and Crafts, San Francisco, January 17 - March 3Give and Take, Serpentine Gallery in collaboration with the Victoria and Albert Museum, London, January 30 - April 1Making the Making, Apex Art, New York, January 5 - February 3Waterworks: U.S. Akvarell 2001, curated by Kim Levin, Nordiska Akvarellmuseet, Skarhamn, Sweden01.01.01: Art in Technological Times, San Francisco Museum of Modern Art, San Francisco, CAAll-Terrain, Contemporary Art Center of Virginia, Virginia Beach, VA

2000From a Distance: Approaching Landscape, curated by Jessica Morgan, Institute of Contemporary Art, Boston, MAWILDflowers, Katonah Museum of Art, Katonah, NY, July 28 - October 3Working in Brooklyn: Beyond Technology, Brooklyn Museum of Art, Brooklyn, NY, July 1 - September 125th Lyon Biennale of Contemporary Art: Sharing Exoticism, Lyon Biennale, Lyon, France, June 27 - September 24Vision Ruhr, Dortmund Coal Factory, Dortmund, Germany, May 11 - August 20The Greenhouse Effect, Serpentine Gallery, London, April 4 - May 21Sites Around the City: Art and Environment, curated by Heather Sealy Lineberry, Arizona State University Art Museum, Tempe, AZ, March 4 - June 4Greater New York: New Art in New York Now, PS1 Contemporary Art Center in collaboration with the Museum of Modern Art, New York, February 27 - April 16Visionary Landscape, Christopher Grimes Gallery, Santa Monica, CA, January 8 - February 19. Travelled to The End, Exit Art/The First World, New York, January 29 - April 8As Far As the Eye Can See, Atlanta College of Art Gallery, Atlanta, GA, January 29 - March 7

1999Best of the Season: Selected Work from the 1998-99 Gallery Season, The Aldrich Contemporary Art Museum, Ridgefield, CT, September 26 - January 9, 1999

1998Interlacings: The Craft of Contemporary Art, Whitney Museum of American Art at Champion, Stamford, CT, September 10 - November 2122/21, Emily Lowe Gallery/Hofstra Museum, Hempstead, NY, September 8 - October 25Elise Goodheart Fine Art, Sag Harbor, NY, July 24 - August 16DNA Gallery, Provincetown, MA, July 17 - August 5Nine International Artists at Wanas, 1998, Wanas Foundation, Knislinge, Sweden, May 24 - August 18Landscapes, Meyerson & Nowinski, Seattle, WA, January 8 - March 1

1997Redefinitions, A View From Brooklyn, California State University, Fullerton, CA, November 9 - December 11Sculpture, James Graham & Sons, New York, July 10 - August 29Summer of Love, Fotouhi Cramer Gallery, New York, July 2 - August 2Artists Respond to 2001: Space Odyssey, Williamsburg Arts and Historical Society, Brooklyn, June 21 - July 26Benefit for Pat Hearn, Morris-Healey Gallery, New York, February 26 - March 99 to 5 at Metrotech: New Commissions for the Common, The Public Art Fund, Brooklyn, NY, October 30, 1997 - May 31, 1998Best of the Season 1996-97, The Aldrich Museum of Contemporary Art, Ridgefield, CT, September 14 - January 4, 1997Current Undercurrent: Working in Brooklyn, Brooklyn Museum of Art, Brooklyn, July 25, 1997 - January 25, 1998

1996Imaginary Beings, Exit Art/The First World, New York, December 2 - January 27, 1996Art on Paper, Weatherspoon Art Gallery, The University of North Carolina, Greensboro, NC, November 12 - January 21, 1996Human/Nature, The New Museum of Contemporary Art, New York, NY, April 20 - May 18Better Living Through Chemistry, Randolph Street Gallery, Chicago, March - April, 1996Momenta Art, Inside Out, Brooklyn, September 15 - October 7, 1996Currents in Contemporary Art, Christie's East, New York, July 22–31, 1996Inside: The Work of Art, California Center for the Arts, Escondido, CA, June 16 - October 13, 1996Wish You Were Here, Bronwyn Keenan Gallery, New York, March 1–30, 1996New York State Biennial, New York State Museum, Albany, NY, February 8 - May 26, 1996NY Withdrawing, Ronald Feldman Fine Arts, New York, January 13 - February 17, 1996Multiples, Pierogi 2000, Brooklyn, NY, December 2, 1995 - January 15, 1996

1995Lookin' Good-Feelin', 450 Broadway Gallery, New York, December 5–9, 1995

1994Red Windows: Benefit for Little Red School House, Barneys Windows, November - December, 1994Spring Benefit, Sculpture Center, New York, April 19, 1994Garden of Sculptural Delights, Exit Art/The First World, New York, NY, March 2 - April 23, 1994Free Falling, Berlin Shafir Gallery, New York, January 22 - February 19, 1994

1993UNTITLED (14), Ronald Feldman Fine Arts, New York, November 13 - December 23, 1993INFLUX, Gallery 400, Chicago, November 3 - December 4, 19934 Walls Benefit, David Zwirner Gallery, New York, November 1993Fantastic Wandering, Cummings Art Center, New London, CT, October 9 - November 10, 1993Extracts, Islip Art Museum, Islip, NY, August 8 - September 19, 1993Real Art Ways, Popular Mechanics, Hartford, CT, June 19 - July 16, 1993Outside Possibilities '93, The Rushmore Festival at Woodbury, New York, June 5 - July 4, 1993The Nature of the Machine, Chicago Cultural Center, Chicago, April 3 - May 30, 1993Out of Town: The Williamsburg Paradigm, Krannert Art Museum, University of Illinois, Champaign, IL, January 22- February 28, 1993

1992Fever, Exit Art, New York, December 14, 1992 - February 6, 1993

1991Group, Jimenez-Algus Gallery, Brooklyn, September 13 - October 13, 1991Generator 547, Entropy, New York, August 2 - September 5, 1991Tweeking the Human, Brand Name Damages and Minor Injury Galleries, Brooklyn, June 7–31, 1991The Ego Show, Minor Injury Gallery, Brooklyn, April 5 - May 2, 1991

1990Desire and Deception, Brand Name Damages, Brooklyn, October 9–21, 1990Group Show, Ridge Street Gallery, New York, September 3–26, 1990Roxy Paine and David Fasoldt'', Brand Name Damages, Brooklyn, NY, March 29 - April 6, 1990

Awards
Roxy Paine was awarded by the John Simon Guggenheim Memorial Foundation Fellowship in 2006.
He also received a Trustees Award for an Emerging Artist by, The Aldrich Museum of Contemporary Art, Ridgefield, CT in 1997.

Public collections
The artist Roxy Paine contributed many of his works to the following locations:

City of Beverly Hills, CA
Crystal Bridges Museum of American Art, Bentonville, AR
De Pont Museum of Contemporary Art, Tilburg, The Netherlands
Denver Art Museum, Denver, CO
Frederik Meijer Gardens and Sculpture Park, Grand Rapids, MI
Hirshhorn Museum and Sculpture Garden, Washington, D.C.
Il Giardino Dei Lauri, Città della Pieve (PG), Italy
Israel Museum, Jerusalem
Modern Art Museum of Fort Worth, TX
Museum of Modern Art, New York, NY
National Gallery of Art Sculpture Garden, Washington, D.C.
National Gallery of Canada, Ottawa, ON
Nelson-Atkins Museum of Art, Kansas City, MO
The New School for Social Research, New York, NY
North Carolina Museum of Art, Raleigh, NC
Fundación NMAC, Cadiz, Spain
Olympic Sculpture Park, Seattle Art Museum, WA
Rose Art Museum, Brandeis University, Waltham, MA
Saint Louis Art Museum, St. Louis, MO
San Francisco Museum of Modern Art, CA
Sheldon Memorial Art Gallery, University of Nebraska, Lincoln, NE
Wanas Foundation, Knislinge, Sweden
Whitney Museum of American Art, New York, NY

See also

References

External links

Brooklyn Rail Curatorial Projects
False Narratives at Pierogi
Kavi Gupta CHICAGO | BERLIN
Marianne Boesky Gallery
James Cohan Gallery
Roxy Paine in Madison Square Park
Public Art Fund: Whitney Biennial in Central Park, 2002
National Gallery of Canada: Roxy Paine - One Hundred Foot Line, 2010
Interview with Roxy Paine at ARTINFO.com
Conversation between Roxy Paine and Allan McCollum
Roxy Paine at NMAC Foundation
Maelstrom at the Metropolitan Museum of Art, New York, NY
Ken Johnson's review of Maelstrom, The New York Times
Blake Gopnik's review of Graft, National Gallery of Art Sculpture Garden, The Washington Post
Hilarie Sheet's feature 'Man of Steel's Industrial Web Mirroring Nature,' The New York Times.

20th-century American sculptors
Contemporary sculptors
Pratt Institute alumni
Santa Fe University of Art and Design alumni
1966 births
Living people
21st-century American sculptors